The 1956 Dunedin mayoral election was part of the New Zealand local elections held that same year. In 1956, elections were held for the Mayor of Dunedin plus other local government positions including twelve city councillors. The polling was conducted using the standard first-past-the-post electoral method.

Len Wright, the incumbent Mayor, was re-elected for a third term, easily defeating his sole opponent councillor Michael Connelly of the Labour Party.

Results
The following table shows the results for the election:

References

Mayoral elections in Dunedin
Dunedin
Politics of Dunedin
1950s in Dunedin
November 1956 events in New Zealand